Reinvention is the second remix album from Christian rock band Superchick. It was released on April 20, 2010 and peaked at No. 18 on the Billboard Christian Albums chart. A solo breakout from bassist Matt Dally entitled "Let It Roll", was the project's debut single. The second release was "Still Here".

Track listing
 "Cross the Line (Box Office Blockbuster Mix)"
 "Rock What You Got (Fight Underdog Fight! Mix)"
 "Let It Roll - Matt Dally with Superchick"
 "Karaoke Superstars (Shiny Car Advert Mix) - Superchick with ThumpMonks"
 "Hey Hey (Vampires vs. Cheerleaders Mix)"
 "One and Lonely (Chick Flick Mix)"
 "Breathe (Don't You Die On Me Mix)"
 "Bowling Ball (Not That Into You Mix)"
 "Pure (Brand New Day Mix)"
 "Wishes (Teens Falling In/Out of Love Mix)"
 "Still Here"
 "With You - Tricia Brock"

References

Superchick albums
2010 remix albums
Inpop Records remix albums